Hestiochora intermixta is a moth of the family Zygaenidae. It is found in Australia from Queensland, New South Wales and South Australia.

External links
Australian Faunal Directory
Zygaenid moths of Australia: a revision of the Australian Zygaenidae

Procridinae
Moths described in 2005